was the 88th emperor of Japan, according to the traditional order of succession. This reign spanned the years 1242 through 1246.

This 13th-century sovereign was named after the 8th-century Emperor Saga and go- (後), translates literally as "later"; and thus, he is sometimes called the "Later Emperor Saga". The Japanese word go has also been translated to mean the "second one;" and in some older sources, this emperor may be identified as "Saga, the second", or as "Saga II".

Genealogy

He was the second son of Emperor Tsuchimikado, and second cousin of his predecessor Emperor Shijō.

Empress: Saionji (Fujiwara) no Yoshi-ko (西園寺（藤原）姞子) Later Ōmiya-in (大宮院), Saionji Saneuji’s daughter
Fourth son: Imperial Prince Hisahito (久仁親王) later Emperor Go-Fukakusa
First daughter: Imperial Princess Osako (綜子内親王; 1247-1269）later Gekkamon-in (月華門院)
Seventh son: Imperial Prince Tsunehito (恒仁親王) later Emperor Kameyama
Eleventh son: Imperial Prince Masataka (雅尊親王; 1254-1256)
Thirteenth son: Imperial Prince Sadayoshi (貞良親王; 1256-1260)
Princess (b.1260)

Consort: Imperial Princess Taishi (体子内親王; 1231-1302) later Shinsenmon’in (神仙門院), Emperor Go-Horikawa’s daughter
 Princess (d.1281)

Court Lady: Saionji (Fujiwara) Kimiko (西園寺（藤原）公子), Saionji Kintsune's daughter
 Son: Imperial Prince Priest jijo (慈助法親王; 1254-1295）
 Daughter: Imperial Princess Etsuko (悦子内親王; 1260-1332）later Enseimon’in (延政門院)

Lady-in-waiting: Taira no Muneko (平棟子), Taira no Munemoto's daughter
Third son: Imperial Prince Munetaka (宗尊親王)

Handmaid?: Fujiwara Hiroko (藤原博子), Fujiwara Takatoki's daughter
Eighth son: Imperial Prince Priest Kakujo  (覚助法親王; 1247-1336)
Princess
Sixth daughter: Imperial Princess Ekishi (懌子内親王; 1262-1294) later Gojo’in (五条院)

Court Lady: Fujiwara Fujiko (藤原藤子), Shijo Takahira's daughter
 Son: Imperial Prince Priest Saijo (最助法親王; 1253-1293）

Court Lady: Mikushige-dono (御匣殿), Sanjo Kinfusa's daughter
 Son: Imperial Prince Priest Chujo (忠助法親王; d.1290)
 Sixth Son: Imperial Prince Priest Shōjo (性助法親王; 1247-1282）

Court Lady: Anegakoji Saneyo's daughter
 Son: Imperial Prince Priest Jōjo (浄助法親王; 1253-1280）

Court Lady: Emontoku-no-tsubone (右衛門督局), Ichijo Yoshiyasu's daughter
 Son: Imperial Prince Priest Enjo (円助法親王; 1236-1282）

Court Lady: Nijo-no-Tsubone (二条局), Fujiwara Toshimori's daughter
 Second Daughter: Imperial Princess Yasuko (愷子内親王; 1249-1284）

Court Lady: Ichijo-dono-no-tsubone (一条殿局), Fujiwara no Kanefusa’s daughter
Son: Imperial Prince Priest Nin’e (仁恵法親王; 1244-1298）

Court Lady: Dainagon-no-Tsubone (大納言局), Nakanoin Michikata's daughter
 Prince (1243)

Court Lady: Kujō Yoshihira's daughter

Court Lady: Minamoto no Yorimasa's granddaughter
 Priest Shojo

Court Lady: Fujiwara clan's descendant
 Second Son: Kōhō Ken'nichi (高峰顕日; 1241-1316)

Events of Go-Saga's life
He ruled from 21 February 1242, to 16 February 1246.

When Emperor Tsuchimikado moved to Tosa Province (on Shikoku), he was raised by his mother's side of the family.

Because of the sudden death of Emperor Shijō at the age of 10, the question of succession arose.  Because the expectations of the court nobility and the Bakufu conflicted, the issue was bitterly contested. Kujō Michiie and the court nobility supported Prince Tadanari (忠成王), a son of Retired Emperor Juntoku, but the shikken Hōjō Yasutoki was opposed to the sons of Juntoku because of his involvement in the Jōkyū War.  Michiie instead supported Tsuchimikado's son Prince Kunihito as a neutral figure for Emperor.  During these negotiations, there was a vacancy on the throne of 11 days.

 11 February 1242 (Ninji 3, 10th day of the 1st month): In the 10th year of Shijō-tennō 's reign (四条天皇10年), the emperor died suddenly; and despite a dispute over who should follow him as sovereign, contemporary scholars then construed that the succession (senso) was received by the second son of former Emperor Tsuchimikado.
 19 April 1242 (Ninji 3, 18th day of the 3rd month): Emperor Go-Saga is said to have acceded to the throne (sokui).

In 1242, Prince Kunihito became emperor.  In 1246 he abdicated to his son, Emperor Go-Fukakusa, beginning his reign as cloistered emperor.  In 1259, he compelled Emperor Go-Fukakusa to abdicate to his younger brother, Emperor Kameyama. Imperial Prince Munetaka became shōgun instead of the Hōjō regents.  Henceforth, the shōguns of the Kamakura Bakufu came from the imperial house.  Still, the Hōjō regents increased their control of the shogunate, setting up the system of rule by regents.

The descendants of his two sons contested the throne between them, forming into two lines, the Jimyōin-tō (Go-Fukakusa's descendants) and the Daikakuji-tō (Kameyama's descendants). Their lines would eventually lead to the split between the Northern and Southern Courts.

In 1272, Go-Saga died.

Go-Saga's final resting place is designated as an Imperial mausoleum (misasagi) at Saga no minami no Misasagi at Tenryū-ji in Kyoto.

Kugyō
 is a collective term for the very few most powerful men attached to the court of the Emperor of Japan in pre-Meiji eras. Even during those years in which the court's actual influence outside the palace walls was minimal, the hierarchic organization persisted.

In general, this elite group included only three to four men at a time.  These were hereditary courtiers whose experience and background would have brought them to the pinnacle of a life's career.  During Go-Saga's reign, this apex of the Daijō-kan included:
 Kampaku, Konoe Kanetsune, 1242
 Kampaku, Nijō Yoshizane, 1242–1246
 Kampaku, Ichijō Sanetsune, 1246
 Sadaijin
 Udaijin
 Nadaijin
 Dainagon

Eras of Go-Saga's reign
The years of Go-saga's reign are more specifically identified by more than one era name or nengō.
 Ninji   (1240–1243)
 Kangen  (1243–1247)

Ancestry

See also
 Emperor of Japan
 List of Emperors of Japan
 Imperial cult

Notes

References

 Ponsonby-Fane, Richard Arthur Brabazon. (1959).  The Imperial House of Japan. Kyoto: Ponsonby Memorial Society. OCLC 194887
 Titsingh, Isaac, ed. (1834). [Siyun-sai Rin-siyo/Hayashi Gahō, 1652], Nipon o daï itsi ran; ou, Annales des empereurs du Japon.  Paris: Oriental Translation Fund of Great Britain and Ireland.
 Varley, H. Paul , ed. (1980). [ Kitabatake Chikafusa, 1359], Jinnō Shōtōki  (A Chronicle of Gods and Sovereigns: Jinnō Shōtōki. New York: Columbia University Press. 

 
 

Japanese emperors
1220 births
1272 deaths
Emperor Go-Saga
1240s in Japan
13th-century Japanese monarchs